Wales at the 1930 British Empire Games was abbreviated WAL. They have competed in every edition of the Commonwealth Games. In the first edition, just 11 teams took part and of them, 5 other countries have also competed in every edition since then.

Wales came 7th overall in the games, with 2 silver medals and 1 bronze. All three medals were won by the female swimmer Valerie Davies.

Wales was not invited to deliver an athletics team to the games. This was probably due to the structure of Welsh athletics at the time. Various English regional associations governed the sport in Wales with no Welsh national association in existence. Reg Thomas, the 1930 Welsh 880 yards and 1 mile champion, competed as a member of the English team. He won the mile and placed second in the 880yds.

Individual medallists

References
General

Specific

See also

1930
Nations at the 1930 British Empire Games
Com